Edwin Frederick O'Brien (born April 8, 1939) is an American prelate of the Roman Catholic Church. He has been a cardinal since 2012 and headed the Order of the Holy Sepulchre from 2011 to 2019.

O'Brien served as archbishop of the Archdiocese of Baltimore from 2007 to 2011 and as archbishop of the Archdiocese of the Military Services, USA, from 1997 to 2007.  He was an auxiliary bishop of the Archdiocese of New York from 1996 to 1997.

Early life and education
Edwin O'Brien was born on April 8, 1939, in the Bronx, New York, to Edwin Frederick, Sr. and Mary Winifred O'Brien. One of three children, he had two brothers, Ken and Tom, now deceased. O'Brien graduated from Our Lady of Solace Parish School in the Bronx in 1953 and attended St. Mary's High School in Katonah, New York from 1953 to 1957.

O'Brien entered St. Joseph's Seminary in Yonkers, New York in 1959, where he obtained his Bachelor of Arts (1961), Master of Divinity (1964), and Master of Arts (1965) degrees.

Priesthood
O'Brien was ordained to the priesthood for the Archdiocese of New York by Cardinal Francis Spellman on May 29, 1965.

O'Brien served as a civilian chaplain at the United States Military Academy at West Point until 1970, when he enlisted in the U.S. Army Chaplain Corps with the rank of Captain. He took flight training with parachute jumping. In 1970, O'Brien began serving as a chaplain at Fort Bragg in North Carolina with the 82nd Division.  He was sent to South Vietnam in 1971 during the Vietnam War, with the 173rd Airborne Brigade and the 3rd Brigade, 1st Cavalry Division. While in South Vietnam, O'Brien was based in the countryside and flew with a Protestant minister by helicopter to minister to soldiers. In 1972, O'Brien was transferred to Georgia serve as post chaplain at Fort Gordon in Georgia until his discharged from the service in 1973.

In 1973, O'Brien was sent by Cardinal Terence Cooke to study in Rome at the Pontifical North American College. O'Brien graduated from the Pontifical University of St. Thomas Aquinas Angelicum with a Doctorate in Sacred Theology in 1976.  His dissertation was titled The Origin and Development of Moral Principles in the Theology of Paul Ramsey.

Returning to New York, O'Brien served as both the vice-chancellor of the Archdiocese of New York and associate pastor at St. Patrick Cathedral Parish from 1976 to 1981. He coordinated Pope John Paul II's visit to New York in 1979 and was the archdiocesan director of communications from 1981 to 1983. Between 1983 and 1985, O'Brien  served as priest-secretary to Cardinal Cooke and then to his successor, Cardinal John O'Connor.

O'Brien was elevated by the Vatican to honorary prelate of his holiness in 1986. He served as rector of St. Joseph's Seminary from 1985 to 1989, and of the Pontifical North American College  from 1990 to 1994. Returning to New York, O'Brien served another term as rector of St. Joseph's from 1994 to 1997.

Auxiliary Bishop of New York 
On February 6, 1996, John Paul II appointed O'Brien as auxiliary bishop of the Archdiocese of  New York and titular bishop of ThizicaI. He received his episcopal consecration on  March 25, 1996, by Cardinal O'Connor, with Bishops Patrick Sheridan and John Nolan serving as co-consecrators, at St. Patrick's Cathedral. O'Brien selected as his episcopal motto: Pastores Dabo Vobis, meaning, "I will give you shepherds" Jeremiah 3:15. 

During this time, O’Brien continued to serve as rector of St. Joseph's Seminary. While serving in that capacity, he ordained (with special permission from the Vatican) Rev. Eugene Hamilton, a 24-year old seminarian who was suffering from terminal cancer.  Cardinal O'Connor, then archbishop of New York, had successfully petitioned the Vatican for Hamilton's early ordination, which O'Brien officiated only hours before Hamilton died.

Archbishop for the Military Services

On April 7, 1997, John Paul II appointed O'Brien as coadjutor archbishop for the Archdiocese of the Military Services, USA. He succeeded Archbishop Joseph Dimino when he retired on August 12, 1997. During his 10 years as archbishop of the Military Services, O'Brien divided his time between visiting American troops and working with the Pontifical North American College. In 1993, he initiated the cause of canonization for Emil Kapaun, a US Army chaplain killed during the Korean War.

From September 2005 to June 2006, O'Brien served in the additional role of the Vatican's coordinator for the Papal Visitation of Seminaries and Houses of Priestly Formation. He expressed his personal opposition to admitting gay men to seminaries, a position he said was "based on 12 years' experience as rector of two U.S. seminaries". His report also called for a stronger focus on moral theology, increased oversight of seminarians, and greater involvement of diocesan bishops in the formation process. He was recognized as being "instrumental in Catholic seminary reform in the wake of clergy sex abuse disclosures."

In 2006, O'Brien noted that declining public support for the Iraq War was leading to a decrease in morale among the troops, adding, "The news only shows cars being blown up, but the soldiers see hospitals being built and schools opening." By 2007, he believed that the status of US operations in Iraq "compels an assessment of our current circumstances and the continuing obligation of the Church to provide a moral framework for public discussion." O'Brien refused to "question the moral integrity of our military personnel," but added, "[O]ur nation must honestly assess what is achievable in Iraq using the traditional just war principles of 'probability of success' ... Our troops should remain in Iraq only as long as their presence contributes to a responsible transition."

O'Brien opposed the National Defense Authorization Act of 2007, saying it "would seek to impose a legislative mandate for military chaplains without considering the religious needs of all military members ... [and] may well result in less public prayer and marginalization of military chaplains." He was appointed a member of the Congregation for Catholic Education in the Roman Curia in May 2007.

Archbishop of Baltimore

On July 12, 2007, Pope Benedict XVI appointed O'Brien as the 15th archbishop of the  Archdiocese of Baltimore. Recalling the call he received from the apostolic nunciature, O'Brien immediately accepted the appointment and later remarked, "I guess that's one thing I take from the military. When you're given an order, you accept." He succeeded Cardinal William Keeler. O'Brien was installed at the Cathedral of Mary Our Queen on  October 1, 2007.

As head of the nation's oldest diocese, O'Brien held the status of primus inter pares in the American hierarchy. Commenting on O'Brien's appointment, The Baltimore Sun said, "He has leapt from military airplanes, served in jungles during the Vietnam War and travelled extensively to current battle zones in Afghanistan and Iraq. From his working-class roots ... to the upper echelons of Catholic power—carrying a Christian message of peace and love to some of the world's worst war-torn terrain". Following his tour of the archdiocese, O'Brien lamented the amount of poverty and violence in Baltimore, saying, "I think anybody who wants to take a walk can find areas with very nice homes, well-kept lawns, good streets and sidewalks, and maybe 15 minutes later find themselves in a neighborhood that is just racked, torn apart, as if a war had just been fought."On June 29, 2008, Benedict XVI invested O'Brien with the pallium, a vestment worn by metropolitan bishops, at St. Peter's Basilica in Rome. In October 2008, O'Brien dedicated the Pope John Paul II Prayer Garden in Baltimore, which he called a "sanctuary in a suffering city," in downtown Baltimore. O'Brien's three years and 11 months as archbishop was one of the briefest terms in Baltimore's history. His departure also marked the first time the see had been vacant since 1947.

Grand Master of the Equestrian Order of the Holy Sepulchre of Jerusalem

On August 17, 2011, after Cardinal John Foley reached the mandatory retirement age, Cardinal Tarcisio Bertone asked O'Brien during a visit to Rome if he would assume the position of pro-grand master. O'Brien accepted the next day and was appointed on August 29, 2011.

Benedict XVI elevated O'Brien to cardinal along with 21 others on February 18, 2012. O'Brien was created cardinal-deacon of San Sebastiano al Palatino, the same titular church held by Cardinal Foley. O'Brien was named grand master of the Equestrian Order of the Holy Sepulchre of Jerusalem on March 15, 2012.

On April 21, 2012, O'Brien was appointed a member of the Congregation for the Oriental Churches and the Pontifical Council Cor Unum. He participated in the 2013 papal conclave that elected Pope Francis.

Pope Francis accepted O'Brien's resignation as grand master on December 8, 2019.On March 4, 2022, he was elevated to the rank of cardinal priest.

Views

Abortion
O'Brien opposes abortion rights for women, calling it the "greatest civil rights issue of our time" and saying, "[The right to life] will determine whether America remains a hospitable society: committed to caring for women in crisis and their unborn children; committed to caring for those with special needs; committed to caring for the elderly and the dying; or whether America betrays our heritage and the truths on which its founders staked its claim to independence." During the 2008 US presidential election, O'Brien lamented that the "clear and unchanged teaching of our Church from its earliest days has been so distorted in political debate and commentary," an indirect criticism of remarks made by House Speaker Nancy Pelosi and then-Senator Joe Biden concerning the church's teaching on abortion. In March 2009, O'Brien said he was both "disappointed and bewildered" by the decision of the University of Notre Dame to have President Barack Obama deliver the commencement speech and receive an honorary degree at the university's graduation ceremony, given Obama's support for abortion rights for women and embryonic stem cell research (which O'Brien opposes).

Capital punishment
In 2008, O'Brien expressed his opposition to capital punishment, citing the John Paul II's encyclical Evangelium Vitae, although he had previously "thought it served a purpose."

Legion of Christ

As archbishop of Baltimore, O'Brien was an outspoken critic of the Legion of Christ. He condemned the Legion for its alleged practice of "blind allegiance",  lack of "respect for human dignity for each of its members", and "heavily persuasive methods on young people, especially high schoolers, regarding vocations."

In June 2008, O'Brien called for greater "transparency and accountability" from the Legion of Christ and its lay arm, Regnum Christi, including both consecrated and non-consecrated members.  O'Brien wanted to expel the Legion from the archdiocese, but the Vatican persuaded him not to.  Instead, discussions were held with the Superior General Álvaro Corcuera Martínez del Río of the Legion.  As a result, Martínez del Río directed the Legion and Regnum Christi chapters in the archdiocese to disclosed all their activities.  He also directed them to stop providing spiritual direction to anyone under age 18. The Legion subsequently saw decreasing enrollment in the archdiocese, leading its leaders to close its Woodmont Academy in Cooksville, Maryland.

In February 2009, the Legion of Christ superiors acknowledged that their founder, Marcial Maciel, had engaged in "inappropriate" behavior. This included including drug and sexual abuse as well as fathering a child.) O'Brien said that the Legion must offer "full disclosure of [Maciel's] activities and those who are complicit in them, or knew of them, and of those who are still refusing to offer disclosure," adding that the institute's finances should also be subject to "objective scrutiny." O'Brien called Maciel "a man with an entrepreneurial genius who, by systematic deception and duplicity, used our faith to manipulate others for his own selfish ends." O'Brien welcomed the Vatican's decision in March 2009 to conduct an apostolic visitation of the Legion and said that its abolition "should be on the table."

Just War
O'Brien has been an outspoken proponent of the just war theory. Sometimes called the "Warrior Cardinal", he is seen as a controversial figure and is considered to have given moral justifications for the 2003 US invasion in Iraq.  Early in 2003, O'Brien spoke at the United States Military Academy at West Point at Mass: "I know that a lot of people have said that the Pope is against war with Iraq ... But even if he did, you are not bound by conscience to obey his opinion. However, you are bound in conscience to obey the orders of your Commander-in-Chief, and if he orders you to go to war, it is your duty to go to war".On March 25, 2003, a few days after the U.S. invasion of Iraq, in a letter to U.S. Catholic military chaplains, O'Brien wrote: "Given the complexity of factors involved, many of which understandably remain confidential, it is altogether appropriate for members of our armed forces to presume the integrity of our [military] leadership and its judgments, and therefore to carry out their military duties in good conscience ... It is to be hoped that all factors which have led to our intervention will eventually be made public, and ... will shed helpful light upon our President's decision". O'Brien did not endorse the war or the motivations behind it. Supporters of the war in Iraqi cited his positions. He was criticized by opponents of the war for distancing himself from the position of the Holy See and the U.S. Conference of Catholic Bishops.

According to Sabrina Ferrisi, O'Brien's  spiritual direction proved effective in calming the doubts of soldiers, advising them that they can safely leave the responsibility for moral decision-making to the Government. O'Brien believes that chaplains play an essential role in helping soldiers perform their fighting duties with a clear conscience, and in easing relationships with local populations and to avoid such gross misconduct as the torture of prisoners at Abu Ghraib. O'Brien has complained that too few Catholics priests are serving in active duty, being replaced by chaplains of other faiths because the military disregards the significance of denominational affiliation. He consistently rejected discussion with Catholic groups that asked chaplains "to call on all Catholic soldiers to leave Iraq.

In July 2009, at the U.S. Strategic Command Deterrence Symposium, O'Brien explained Just War theories, saying "The moral end we seek ought to shape the means we use", that the U.S. must "move beyond nuclear deterrence as rapidly as possible" and urging the world leaders to "stay focused on the destination of a nuclear-weapons-free world and on the concrete steps that lead there." In September 2013, when President Barack Obama was considering the use of military force in Syria, O'Brien said that "whatever we do will contribute to peace in that part of the world", contradicting the views of the hierarchy of the Catholic Church in Syria.

See also
 Chaplain Corps (United States Army)
 List of Catholic bishops of the United States: military service
 Military chaplain
 Religious symbolism in the United States military
 United States military chaplains

Notes

References

External links
 
 Archdiocese of Baltimore
 Roman Catholic Archdiocese for the Military Services
 Archdiocese for the Military Services, USA, official website
 Archdiocese for the Military Services of the United States. GCatholic.org. Retrieved 2010-08-20.

 

1939 births
People from the Bronx
American Roman Catholic clergy of Irish descent
Saint Joseph's Seminary (Dunwoodie) alumni
United States Military Academy faculty
Living people
United States Army personnel of the Vietnam War
United States Army officers
United States Army chaplains
Pontifical North American College alumni
Pontifical University of Saint Thomas Aquinas alumni
Pontifical North American College rectors
Roman Catholic archbishops of Baltimore
Members of the Congregation for Catholic Education
Members of the Congregation for the Oriental Churches
21st-century American cardinals
Cardinals created by Pope Benedict XVI
Vietnam War chaplains
People from Katonah, New York
Grand Masters of the Order of the Holy Sepulchre
Catholics from New York (state)